Topolovec ( or ) is a settlement in the City Municipality of Koper in the Littoral region of Slovenia on the border with Croatia.

Overview
It is made up of three hamlets: Topolovec, Hrvoji, and Žrnjovec.  The parish church in Hrvoji is dedicated to Saint Zeno. Another church on a hill above Topolovec is dedicated to Saint Jerome.

References

External links
Topolovec on Geopedia

Populated places in the City Municipality of Koper